Acobambilla District is one of nineteen districts of the Huancavelica Province in Peru.

Geography 
There are a couple of large lakes in the district like Anqasqucha, Astuqucha, Chiliqucha, Chunchuqucha, Kanllaqucha, Milluqucha, Papaqucha, Warmiqucha and Ñawinqucha.

The Chunta mountain range traverses the district. Some of the highest peaks of the district are listed below:

References